Bagodar Assembly constituency   is an assembly constituency in  the Indian state of Jharkhand.

Overview
Bagodar Assembly constituency covers Bagodar and Birni Police Stations in Suriya-Bagodar sub-division.

Bagodar assembly constituency is part of Kodarma (Lok Sabha constituency).

Members of Assembly 
As a part of the Bihar Legislative Assembly:
1980: Kharagdhari Narayan Singh, Independent
1985: Gautam Sagar Rana, Lok Dal
1990: Mahendar Prasad Singh, Indian Peoples Front
1995: Mahendar Prasad Singh, Communist Party of India (Marxist–Leninist) Liberation
2000: Mahendar Prasad Singh, Communist Party of India (Marxist–Leninist) Liberation

As a part of the Jharkhand Legislative Assembly:

Election Results

2019

See also
Vidhan Sabha
List of states of India by type of legislature

References
Schedule – XIII of Constituencies Order, 2008 of Delimitation of Parliamentary and Assembly constituencies Order, 2008 of the Election Commission of India 

Assembly constituencies of Jharkhand
Politics of Giridih district